A Word in Your Ear is a game show that originally aired BBC1 from 19 April 1993 to 14 October 1994 then on The Family Channel from 1995. 

The programme originated on ITV Tyne Tees in 1990 and ran for two series locally, on Fridays at 6:30pm, also hosted by Burns as seen in this TV guide from the time. https://transdiffusion.org/2014/10/18/tonights-tv-in-1991/

It was hosted by Gordon Burns, best known for hosting ITV's The Krypton Factor (1977-1995). The host presided over male and female pairs of celebrities as they participate in a few rounds of communication games. Celebrities appearing included Lynsey De Paul, Nick Owen, Philippa Kennedy and Bob Holness.

Transmissions

References

External links

A Word in Your Ear at BFI

1990s British game shows
1993 British television series debuts
1995 British television series endings
BBC television game shows